Afropunk Festival is an annual arts festival that features music, film, fashion, and art produced by alternative black artists. 

The Afropunk Festival began in 2005, at the Brooklyn Academy of Music in New York. Afropunk Festivals have also been held in various major cities, including Atlanta, Paris, London, Brazil, and Johannesburg, South Africa. The festival was co-founded by James Spooner and Matthew Morgan, and grew out of the 2003 documentary titled Afro-Punk which studied black punks across America.

History

2005-2008 
In the early years, the festival was targeted towards black alternative-minded punks. The festival was free and supported by The Brooklyn Academy of Music. As the festival grew, the musical genres shifted towards reaching a larger audience and the festival also began charging an admission fee. Due to festival alterations that deviated from the original Afropunk culture, former co-founder, James Spooner ended his involvement in 2008.

2009-2019 
Jocelyn A. Cooper became involved with the festival in 2009. Afropunk Festival grew to hundreds and thousands of attendees, expanding into the cities of Atlanta, Paris, London, Johannesburg South Africa, Bahia Brazil, Miami, and Minneapolis.

2020-Present 
Afropunk is acquired by entrepreneur Richelieu Dennis and Essence Ventures.

Criticisms 
Having emerged from political punk roots, Afropunk Festival has faced criticism at times, including backlash over booking artists such as MIA, Ice Cube and Tyler the Creator.

Attendees have also critiqued the values of Afropunk's organizers surrounding LGBQT concerns, treatment of employees, and its corporate leanings. Some attendees critique the festival for appealing to white audiences, including an instance of attendees being removed from an area of the festival for wearing a homemade t-shirt critical of the event. In August of 2018, Afropunk's Editor-In-Chief resigned after over a decade of work for Afropunk citing mistreatment and a corporate agenda he labeled "performative activism".

References

Music festivals in New York City
African-American culture
Punk rock festivals
African Americans in New York City